Emil Georg von Stauss (often rendered Emil Georg von Stauß, 6 October 1877 in Baiersbronn – 11 December 1942 in Berlin) was a German banker who served as Director-General of the board of the Deutsche Bank.

Business career
As well as his banking interests von Stauss was also noted for his expertise in the petroleum industry, serving on the board of Deutsche Petroleum from 1920. He became a member of the board at Daimler-Motoren-Gesellschaft in 1925. He would continue his role at Daimler-Benz, eventually serving as chairman of the board. In 1926 he also became chairman of BMW.

Politics
A close friend of Hjalmar Schacht, von Stauss had been cultivating close links to the Nazi Party since 1930. As well as holding several meetings with Adolf Hitler he also knew Hermann Göring well and provided him with significant funding during the Nazi rise to power. Personally closer to Göring, he introduced the Nazi leader to a number of leading business figures at dinner parties, contacts that helped to ensure the smooth transfer of power to the Nazis and avoid the possibility of any opposition from business leaders fearing any socialist aspect to Nazism.

Despite this von Stauss was a high-profile member of the German People's Party (DVP) and represented the group in the Reichstag from 1930 to 1932. He had however been encouraged to retain his membership of the party by Göring, who felt he was more useful in that party, and tried to push the DVP more towards a pro-Nazi Party line in the run up to the Nazi takeover. With the dissolution of the DVP in 1933 he was elected to the Reichstag again in 1933 and served as Vice-President of the body. He was however one of the few members never to take up formal membership of the Nazi Party, sitting as an independent.

References

External links
 

1877 births
1942 deaths
German bankers
Daimler Motoren Gesellschaft
Deutsche Bank people
Directors of BMW
Members of the Reichstag of the Weimar Republic
Members of the Reichstag of Nazi Germany
German People's Party politicians